Goran Milović (born 29 January 1989) is a Croatian professional footballer who plays as a defender for Olimpija Ljubljana.

Club career

RNK Split
In 2008, Goran Milović was promoted from RNK Split's youth academy to their first team, which competed in the Croatian third division at the time. After the club won back-to-back promotions, he made his Croatian top division debut on 31 July 2010 against Varaždin. Overall, he made 80 league appearances for the club, scoring 8 goals.

Hajduk Split
He made a move across the city and joined their city rivals Hajduk Split  in a transfer where Hajduk paid no compensation for his services. Hajduk manager Krasimir Balakov played him in every game for the rest of the season after Milović made his debut against his former club RNK Split. When Mišo Krstičević was appointed as the new manager, Milović remained a vital part of the defense, making 26 appearances in the 2012–13 season. In the 2013–14 season, he made 40 appearances in all competitions and was even handed the captain's armband on four occasions.

Chongqing Lifan
On 2 February 2016, Milović moved to the Chinese Super League side Chongqing Lifan in an €800,000 deal. He signed a three-and-a-half-year deal with the club, worth approximately €500,000 a year. He made his debut for the club on 6 March 2016 in a 2–1 victory against Guangzhou Evergrande. On 12 February 2018, Milović was loaned to Osijek until the end of the season, with a buying option.

KV Oostende
On 13 June 2018, Milović signed a two-year contract with Belgian First Division A club KV Oostende. Chongqing Lifan confirmed on the next day that Milović had terminated the contract with the club and joined KV Oostende on a free transfer.

International career
In October 2015, he received his first call-up for the Croatian senior national team for a friendly game against Russia. In the match against Russia, held on 17 November 2015, he made his debut after replacing Nikola Kalinić in the 75th minute in an eventual 3–1 win.

Honours
RNK Split
 Croatian Third League: 2008–09
 Croatian Second League: 2009–10

Hajduk Split
 Croatian Cup: 2012–13

References

External links
 
 

1989 births
Living people
Footballers from Split, Croatia
Association football central defenders
Croatian footballers
Croatia international footballers
RNK Split players
HNK Hajduk Split players
Chongqing Liangjiang Athletic F.C. players
NK Osijek players
K.V. Oostende players
NK Olimpija Ljubljana (2005) players
Diósgyőri VTK players
Second Football League (Croatia) players
First Football League (Croatia) players
Croatian Football League players
Chinese Super League players
Belgian Pro League players
Slovenian PrvaLiga players
Nemzeti Bajnokság I players
Croatian expatriate footballers
Expatriate footballers in China
Expatriate footballers in Belgium
Expatriate footballers in Slovenia
Expatriate footballers in Hungary
Croatian expatriate sportspeople in China
Croatian expatriate sportspeople in Belgium
Croatian expatriate sportspeople in Slovenia
Croatian expatriate sportspeople in Hungary